The 20th New York Asian Film Festival was held in New York from 6 August to 22 August 2021. The opening film of the festival was Escape from Mogadishu, a South Korean film by Ryoo Seung-wan. Seventy titles were screened both online, as well as in person. The 20th edition of the festival featured two world premieres, six international premieres, twenty nine North American premieres, eight U.S. premieres and nine New York premieres.

2021's festival featured the first ever outdoor screening of Raymond Lee’s wuxia 1992 film New Dragon Gate Inn at Lincoln Center’s Damrosch Park on August 11. The event was co-presented by Hong Kong Economic and Trade Office in New York.

The Uncaged Award for Best Feature Film was awarded to Anima by Cao Jinling.

Screening venues
 Film at Lincoln Center
 SVA Theatre
 Eventive Virtual
 Film at Lincoln Center's Virtual Cinema
 Damrosch Park

New sections
This year a new section is added to focus on Asian American experience.
Asian American Focus selection  

From 20th edition of the festival the non-competitive films are grouped thematically, in the following categories: 
 Beyond Borders    
 Crowd Pleasers
 Frontlines
 Genre Masters  
 Next/Now
 Standouts
 Vanguards

Jury 
 Janice Chua : Vice President of Imagine International.
 Evan Jackson Leong : Director and documentary filmmaker.
 Michael Rosenberg: President of Film Movement.

Films showcase 

Highlighted title indicates award winner

Films by country or region

Uncaged Award for Best Feature Film Competition
Highlighted title indicates award winner

Awards and winners

Uncaged Award for Best Feature Film

Audience Award

Daniel Craft Award for Excellence in Action Cinema

Star Asia Awards

References

External links
 

Asian-American culture in New York City
Film festivals in New York City
Asian-American film festivals
New York Asian